Larisa Catrinici (born 5 March 1961) is a Moldovan physician. She held the office of Minister of Health of Moldova in the Greceanîi Cabinet.

References 

1961 births
Living people
Moldovan physicians
Moldovan politicians